"Thrill Has Gone" is the second single released from Scottish band Texas's first studio album, Southside (1989). The song peaked at number 60 on the UK Singles Chart and number 19 in New Zealand, becoming their last top-20 hit there until "Say What You Want (All Day, Every Day)" in 1998.

Critical reception
Jerry Smith, reviewer of British music newspaper Music Week, called this track a "memorable slice of smooth rock/pop... marked by another stunning vocal" equal to band's previous hit "I Don't Want a Lover" and expressed an assurance that it will "bring more success".

Track listings
7-inch single
A. "Thrill Has Gone"
B. "Nowhere Left to Hide"

12-inch and CD single
 "Thrill Has Gone"
 "Nowhere Left to Hide"
 "Dimples"
 Another version of the 12-inch single that included a free "Thrill Has Gone" tour poster was also released.

Charts

References

1989 singles
1989 songs
British pop rock songs
Mercury Records singles
Phonogram Records singles
Songs written by Johnny McElhone
Songs written by Sharleen Spiteri
Texas (band) songs